Let The Love Go On is the Second album by Me & My. It was released in 1999 and reached #11 in the Danish charts. The song "So Many Men" Is featured in the video game Dance Dance Revolution 3rdMix

Track listing
 "I'm On My Way" - 4:05
 "Loving You" - 3:30
 "I'm Going Down" - 3:54
 "You Left Me" (featuring Pipe) - 4:15
 "Let The Love Go On" - 4:03
 "Take Me Back" - 3:40
 "That's The Way Life Is" - 4:11
 "Every Single Day" - 3:10
 "So Many Men" - 4:01
 "You Do That Thing" - 3:47

Japanese Version

 "I'm On My Way" - 4:03
 "So Many Men" - 3:59
 "Loving You" - 3:51
 "That's The Way Life Is" - 4:09
 "Take Me Back" - 3:38
 "You Left Me" (featuring Pipe) - 4:13
 "Let The Love Go On" - 4:01
 "I'm Going Down" - 3:53
 "Every Single Day" - 3:10
 "You Do That Thing" - 3:46
 "Loving You" (US Radio Mix) for Japan only - 3:29

Me & My albums
1999 albums